Silhouettea sibayi, the Barebreast goby or the Sibayi goby, is a species of goby endemic to southern Africa where it is known from lakes Sibhayi and St. Lucia and Kosi Bay in South Africa, as well as from Piti Lake in Mozambique.  It inhabits areas with sandy substrates down to depths of about  where it lives mostly buried in the sand.  This species can reach a length of  SL.

References

Silhouettea
Freshwater fish of South Africa
Taxonomy articles created by Polbot
Fish described in 1970